Zheng (Old Chinese: *) was a vassal state in China during the Zhou Dynasty (1046–221 BCE) located in the centre of ancient China in modern-day Henan Province on the North China Plain about  east of the royal capital at Luoyang. It was the most powerful of the vassal states at the beginning of the Eastern Zhou (771–701 BCE), and was the first state to clearly establish a code of law in its late period of 543 BCE. Its ruling house had the ancestral name Ji (姬), making them a branch of the Zhou royal house, who were given the rank of Bo, corresponding roughly to being a Count.

Foundation

Zheng was founded in 806 BC when King Xuan of Zhou, the penultimate king of the Western Zhou, made his younger brother Prince You Duke of Zheng and granted him lands within the royal domain in the eponymous Zheng in modern-day Hua County, Shaanxi on the Wei River east of Xi'an. Prince You, known posthumously as Duke Huan of Zheng, established what would be the last bastion of Western Zhou.  He went on to serve as Situ under King You of Zhou.  When the Quanrong tribes sacked the Zhou capital Haojing in 771 BC, Duke Huan was killed along with his nephew King You of Zhou.

Duke Huan was succeeded by his son Duke Wu. Along with Marquis Wen of Jin, Duke Wu supported King Ping of Zhou against a rival, thereby helping to establish the Eastern Zhou. He re-established the state of Zheng in modern-day Xinzheng (meaning New Zheng), Henan, and annexed the states of Eastern Guo and Kuai.  The Zheng rulers served as high ministers of the Zhou kings for several generations.

Spring and Autumn period

Early dominance
The state of Zheng was one of the strongest at the beginning of the Spring and Autumn period. Zheng was the first Zhou state to annex another state, Xi, sometime between 684 and 680 BC. Throughout the Spring and Autumn period, Zheng was one of the wealthiest states, relying on its central location for inter-state commerce and having the largest number of merchants of any state. Zheng often used its wealth to bribe itself out of difficult situations.

Duke Zhuang of Zheng (743–701 BC) was arguably a forerunner of the Five Hegemons, though Zheng derived its dominance by dramatically different means compared to those of the later hegemons by defeating an alliance of feudal states led by Zhou itself and wounding King Huan of Zhou. When Duke Zhuang died there was a civil war between his sons and Zheng ceased to be a powerful state.

Later period

By the later stages of the period, Zheng had no room to expand. Due to its central location, Zheng was hemmed in on all sides by larger states.  During the later stages of the Spring and Autumn period, Zheng frequently switched its diplomatic alliances. Zheng was the center of diplomatic contention between Chu and Qi, then later Chu and Jin. Although Zheng was forced to become a minor player in the later stages of the Spring and Autumn period, it was still quite strong, defeating a combined alliance of Jin, Song, Chen and Wei in 607 BCE.

Under the statesman Zichan, Zheng was the first state to clearly establish a code of law in 543 BCE. Zheng later declined until it was annexed by the state of Han in 375 BCE.

The Zheng family of Xingyang 荥阳郑氏 claim descent from the Zhou dynasty kings through the rulers of the State of Zheng.

The Marquis of Xingyang rank was created for Zheng Xi. The Xingyang Zheng descendants included Zheng Daozhao and Zheng Xi. Zheng Wanjun was a member of the Xingyang Zheng. Other Xingyang Zheng descendants were Zheng Yuzhong (Zheng Qiao) and Zheng Jiong.

List of rulers

Rulers family tree

Other people from Zheng
Zichan, celebrated philosopher and statesman
Zheng Mao, exemplary woman of the Lienü zhuan
Shen Buhai 申不害, future Prime Minister of Han and "Legalist" philosopher.

References

 

 
Ancient Chinese states
States and territories established in the 9th century BC
9th-century BC establishments in China
9th century BC
History of Henan
History of Zhengzhou
375 BC
4th-century BC disestablishments in China
Former monarchies